Dorothy Weyer Creigh (born 12/4/21, Hastings, Nebraska; died 1/2/82, Hastings) was a historian who specialized in the history of Nebraska.  She is listed by Lincoln City Libraries as a significant Nebraska author.

Creigh was chosen to write the story of Nebraska that was published by W.W. Norton as part of their 50-state series to mark the United States Bicentennial of 1976.  She won the Mari Sandoz Award from the Nebraska Library Association in 1981.

References

1921 births
1982 deaths
American women historians
Historians from Nebraska
Writers from Nebraska